Stengers is a surname. Notable people with the surname include:

Isabelle Stengers (born 1949), Belgian philosopher
Jean Stengers (1922–2002), Belgian historian

See also
Stenger
Stenvers